Gerard Finbar Cowhig (July 5, 1921 – December 6, 1995) was an American football player who played five seasons in the National Football League (NFL) with the Los Angeles Rams, Chicago Cardinals and Philadelphia Eagles. He was drafted by the Cleveland Rams in the sixth round of the 1945 NFL Draft. He played college football at the University of Notre Dame. He attended Mechanic Arts High School in Boston, Massachusetts and Marianapolis Preparatory School in Thompson, Connecticut. Cowhig was married to actress Jean Willes and they had one son named Gerry.

References

External links
Just Sports Stats

1995 deaths
1921 births
Players of American football from Boston
American football linebackers
Notre Dame Fighting Irish football players
Los Angeles Rams players
Chicago Cardinals players
Philadelphia Eagles players
Mechanic Arts High School alumni